Carex pachystachya is a species of sedge known by the common name Chamisso sedge.

It is native to western North America from Alaska to Saskatchewan to California. It grows in dry to wet areas in many types of forest and grassland habitat.

Description

The inflorescence is a dense or open cluster of several spikes of flowers. The pistillate flowers are covered in reddish or brown bracts.

The fruit is coated in a sac called a perigynium which is brown or coppery with a metallic sheen and a long dark tip.

External links
Jepson Manual Treatment
Flora of North America
Photo gallery

pachystachya
Flora of the Northwestern United States
Flora of Western Canada
Flora of Alaska
Flora of California
Flora of the Sierra Nevada (United States)
Plants described in 1855
Taxa named by Adelbert von Chamisso
Flora without expected TNC conservation status